Picardi is an Italian surname. Notable people with the surname include:

Adrian Picardi (born 1987), American filmmaker
Eva Picardi (1948–2017), Italian philosopher
Francesco Picardi (1928–2012), Italian politician
John C. Picardi, American playwright
Phillip Picardi, American magazine editor
Vincenzo Picardi (born 1983), Italian boxer

See also 
 Picardy (disambiguation)

Italian-language surnames